Denis Bourdoncle (born October 15, 1964) is a French former professional footballer who played as a defender for a number of Ligue 1 and Ligue 2 clubs during his career.

External links
Denis Bourdoncle profile at chamoisfc79.fr

1964 births
Living people
People from Libourne
Sportspeople from Gironde
French footballers
Association football defenders
FC Girondins de Bordeaux players
FC Libourne players
Chamois Niortais F.C. players
Stade de Reims players
Red Star F.C. players
La Roche VF players
Ligue 1 players
Ligue 2 players
Footballers from Nouvelle-Aquitaine